Light, formerly known as Firefox Light, is a free and open-source web browser based on Firefox. Light is available for the Windows, OS X and Linux operating systems. It differs from Firefox by being built for performance, which it achieves by removing several of Firefox's built in components, including the crash reporter, safe browsing, spell checker, development tools, and support for various types of video and audio media.

References 

Cross-platform free software
Free software programmed in C++
Free web browsers
Gecko-based software
MacOS web browsers
POSIX web browsers
Software using the Mozilla license
Linux web browsers
Windows web browsers